Sylvain Bitan (born 16 October 1941) is a Tunisian athlete. He competed in the men's high jump at the 1960 Summer Olympics.

References

External links
 

1941 births
Living people
Athletes (track and field) at the 1960 Summer Olympics
Tunisian male high jumpers
Olympic athletes of Tunisia
Place of birth missing (living people)
20th-century Tunisian people